Meierturm is a medieval tower in the municipality of Silenen in the canton of Uri in Switzerland.  It is a Swiss heritage site of national significance.

See also
List of castles and fortresses in Switzerland

References

Cultural property of national significance in the canton of Uri
Castles in the canton of Uri